Georissa rufula is a species of minute cave snails, gastropod mollusks in the family Hydrocenidae. This species is endemic to Micronesia.

References

Hydrocenidae
Fauna of Micronesia
Cave snails
Molluscs of Oceania
Gastropods described in 1900
Taxonomy articles created by Polbot